Parisa Damandan, or Parīsā Damandān Nafīsī (born 1967, Isfahan, Iran) is an Iranian photographer and art historian. She received a degree in photography from the University of Tehran. She is the author of Portrait photographs from Isfahan: Faces in transition, 1920-1950, a book illustrating the history of Isfahan in the early 20th century with portrait photographs, which she collected over a period of ten years; the photographs were hard to find because many photo archives in Isfahan had been burned after the enactment of a 1979 law forbidding depictions of unveiled women.

After the 2003 Bam earthquake, Damandan started a project to recover and protect the city's photographic archives. As of 2006, she had recovered over ten thousand negatives, and the project was not yet complete.

References

Iranian photographers
1967 births
Artists from Isfahan
Living people
Iranian women photographers
Women art historians
Iranian art historians